{{Speciesbox
| taxon = Hymeniacidon perlevis
| authority = (Montagu, 1818)
| synonyms =  
 Axinella cristagalli Maas, 1894 
 Halichondria caruncula (Bowerbank, 1858)
 Halichondria macularis Johnston, 1846 
 Halichondria sanguinea (Grant, 1826)
 Hymeniacidon aldousii Bowerbank, 1874
 Hymeniacidon aurea (Montagu, 1814) 
 Hymeniacidon caruncula Bowerbank, 1858 
 Hymeniacidon consimilis Bowerbank, 1866 
 Hymeniacidon hillieri Bowerbank, 1882 
 Hymeniacidon mammeata Bowerbank, 1866 
 Hymeniacidon medius Bowerbank, 1874
 Hymeniacidon perleve [lapsus]
 Hymeniacidon radiosa Bowerbank, 1874
 Hymeniacidon sanguinea (Grant, 1826) 
 Hymeniacidon virgulatus Bowerbank, 1882 
 Hymeniacidon viridans Bowerbank, 1866
 Isodictya uniformis Bowerbank, 1866 
 Polymastia mammeata (Bowerbank, 1866) 
 Raphiodesma simplissima Bowerbank, 1874 
 Reniera uniformis (Bowerbank, 1866) 
 Spongia aurea Montagu, 1814 
 Spongia perlevis Montagu, 1814 
 Spongia sanguinea Grant, 1826 
 Stylinos uniformis (Bowerbank, 1866) 
 Stylotella simplissima (Bowerbank, 1874)
 Stylotella uniformis (Bowerbank, 1866) 
 Suberites paludum Schmidt, 1868

}}

The crumb-of-bread sponge (Hymeniacidon perlevis'') is a species of sea sponge in the class Demospongiae.

Description
The crumb-or-bread sponge is a thickly encrusting sponge with a glistening bumpy surface. Specimens found intertidally are bright yellow. Specimens from deeper water are darker. The oscula are scattered across the surface of the sponge and may be flush with the sponge surface or on raised mounds. The form of the sponge is variable, depending on its environment. In sheltered areas, branched structures grow from the base. In areas with wave action the surface is convoluted or flat.

Distribution
The crumb-of-bread sponge is found in the northern Atlantic Ocean, the Mediterranean sea and the Pacific Ocean, as well as around the southern African coast from the northern Cape to Port St Johns. It lives from the intertidal zone in tide pools to a maximum depth of about 15 meters (about 50 feet).

References

Halichondrida
Fauna of the Atlantic Ocean
Fauna of the Indian Ocean
Fauna of the Mediterranean Sea
Fauna of the Pacific Ocean
Animals described in 1818
Taxa named by George Montagu (naturalist)